Inshaka Siriwardena (born 9 January 2000) is a Sri Lankan cricketer. He made his List A debut on 17 December 2019, for Kalutara Town Club in the 2019–20 Invitation Limited Over Tournament. He made his Twenty20 debut on 4 January 2020, for Kalutara Town Club in the 2019–20 SLC Twenty20 Tournament. He made his first-class debut on 31 January 2020, for Kalutara Town Club in the 2019–20 Premier League Tournament Tier B.

References

External links
 

2000 births
Living people
Sri Lankan cricketers
Kalutara Town Club cricketers
Place of birth missing (living people)